Arctozenus risso, the Spotted barracudina or Ribbon barracudina, is a species of barracudina found in oceans worldwide in the meso- and bathypelagic zone down to abound .  This species grows to a length of  SL. This species is the only known member of its genus. It is an important forage species for many pelagic predators, such as cephalopods, common dolphins, and albacore.

References
 

Paralepididae
Monotypic fish genera
Fish described in 1840
Taxa named by Charles Lucien Bonaparte